Jale may refer to:
 Jale (name), a given name and surname
 Jale (Vidhan Sabha constituency), Bihar, India
 Jale (band), a Canadian alternative rock band.
 a fictional color from the 1920 novel A Voyage to Arcturus by David Lindsay

See also
 
 Jael, biblical figure
 Jaleh (disambiguation)
 Jales (disambiguation)
 Jail (disambiguation)